Miriam Giovanelli (born 28 April 1989) is an Italian-Spanish actress and model.

Biography 
Miriam Giovanelli was born in Rome, Italy to an Italian father and Spanish mother.

Personal life 
On 23 September 2017 she married the Spanish architect Xabi Ortega in Quintanilla de Arriba, Valladolid, Spain. On On 26 November 2019, she gave birth to the couple's first child, a girl, whom they called Renata Ortega Giovanelli, who was born in the clínica Quirón de San José. On On 11 January 2021, she gave birth to the couple's second child, a boy, whom they called Lorenzo Ortega Giovanelli.

Career 
Her filmography includes many Spanish language films and a growing number in the English and Italian languages. Several of these productions have achieved considerable success.

Filmography

References

External links 
 
 Miriam Giovanelli at the Fashion Model Directory

1989 births
Living people
Actresses from Madrid
Spanish female models
Spanish film actresses
Spanish people of Italian descent
Spanish television actresses
21st-century Spanish actresses
Actresses from Rome